The United Counties League operated two divisions in the English football league system, the Premier Division at Step 5 and Division One at Step 6, for the last time this season.

The allocations for Steps 5 and 6 for season 2020–21 were announced by the FA on 21 July 2020, and were subject to appeal.

The league season was subsequently abandoned on 24 February 2021 after COVID-19 lockdown-originated restrictions were imposed.

Promotion and restructuring
The scheduled restructuring of non-league football took place at the end of the season, to include a new division that was added to the United Counties League at Step 5 for 2021–22. Promotions from Steps 5 to 4 and 6 to 5 were based on points per game across all matches over the two abandoned seasons (2019–20 and 2020–21), while teams were promoted to Step 6 on the basis of a subjective application process.

Premier Division

The Premier Division comprised 20 teams, the same set of teams which competed in the previous season's voided competition.

League table

Stadia and locations

Division One

Division One comprised the same 20 teams which competed in the previous season's aborted competition.

League table

Stadia and locations

References

External links
United Counties League FA Full Time

9
United Counties League seasons
Association football events curtailed and voided due to the COVID-19 pandemic